The 2015 Judo Grand Prix Zagreb was held at the Dom Sportova in Zagreb, Croatia from 1 to 3 May 2015.

Medal summary

Men's events

Women's events

Source Results

Medal table

References

External links
 

2015 IJF World Tour
2015 Judo Grand Prix
Grand Prix 2015
Judo
Judo
Judo
Judo
Judo